Edgewater is a city in Volusia County, Florida, United States, situated along the Indian River, adjacent to the Mosquito Lagoon. As of the 2020 United States Census, the city had a population of 23,097. It is a part of the Deltona–Daytona Beach–Ormond Beach, FL metropolitan statistical area, which was home to 590,289 people in 2010.

A settlement in the area was established by John Milton Hawks. It was incorporated in 1915 as the Town of Hawks Park and kept the name Hawks Park until 1924 when the Florida Legislature renamed the town as Edgewater.

Geography

It runs parallel to the Indian River and is largely influenced by the water, which generates tourism, the main contributor to the city's economy.

Demographics

As of the census of 2010, there were 20,750 people, 8,786 households, and 5,849 families residing in the city. The racial makeup of the city was 94.1% White, 2.6% African American, 0.3% Native American, 0.9% Asian, 0.0% Pacific Islander, 0.30% from other races, and 1.6% from two or more races. Hispanic or Latino of any race were 3.4% of the population.

There were 8,786 households, out of which 22.3% had children under the age of 18 living with them, 49.0% were married couples living together, 12.1% had a female householder with no husband present, and 33.4% were non-families. 26.0% of all households were made up of individuals, and 13.6% had someone living alone who was 65 years of age or older. The average household size was 2.36 and the average family size was 2.79.

In the city, the population was spread out, with 19.2% under the age of 18, 4.7% from 20 to 24, 21.6% from 25 to 44, 30.0% from 45 to 64, and 22.1% who were 65 years of age or older. The median age was 46.7 years. For every 100 females, there were 92.2 males. For every 100 females age 18 and over, there were 89.6 males.

The median income for a household in the city was $47,750, and the median income for a family was $35,852. Males had a median income of $27,453 versus $21,999 for females. The per capita income for the city was $17,017. About 6.4% of families and 9.2% of the population were below the poverty line, including 16.0% of those under age 18 and 4.9% of those age 65 or over.

City officials

Elected
 Diezel DePew, Mayor (term ends 2026)
 Charlotte Gillis, Councilperson, District 1 (term ends 2026)
 Gigi Bennington, Councilperson, District 2 (term ends 2024)
 Debbie Dolbow, Councilperson, District 3 (term ends 2026)
 Jonah Powers, Councilperson, District 4 (term ends 2024)

Economy
Local businesses include those in the construction, boat, garment, and honey industries, such as Boston Whaler and Tropical Blossom Honey.
Recent studies show a workforce with 10 percent underemployed. The city is within an hour's drive of seven colleges and universities and an Advanced Technology Center. The education, health care, and government sectors are the area's largest employers.

Notable people

 Adam Lovell, founder and owner of WriteAPrisoner.com
 Cindy Lovell, educator and writer
 Peter Wolf Toth, sculptor
 Tilly van der Zwaard, Dutch athlete

References

External links
 City of Edgewater official website

Cities in Volusia County, Florida
Populated places on the Intracoastal Waterway in Florida
Populated places established in 1951
Cities in Florida